A Natural History of Rape: Biological Bases of Sexual Coercion is a 2000 book by the biologist Randy Thornhill and the anthropologist Craig T. Palmer, in which the authors argue that evolutionary psychology can account for rape among human beings, maintain that rape is either a behavioral adaptation or a byproduct of adaptive traits such as sexual desire and aggressiveness, and make proposals for preventing rape. They also criticize the assumption that there is a connection between what is naturally selected and what is morally right or wrong, which they refer to as the "naturalistic fallacy", and the idea, popularized by the feminist author Susan Brownmiller in Against Our Will (1975), that rape is an expression of male domination and is not sexually motivated.

The book received extensive media coverage following the publication of an extract in The Sciences. It became controversial, received many negative reviews, and was denounced by feminists. Thornhill and Palmer were criticized for suggesting that rape is a reproductive adaptation, misrepresenting Brownmiller, making questionable comparisons between humans and non-human animals such as insects, their treatment of the naturalistic fallacy, and their proposals for preventing rape. In response to their suggestion that rape is a reproductive adaptation, critics observed that many rapes, such as those involving young children, the elderly, or persons of the same sex, cannot lead to reproduction. Critics also characterized A Natural History of Rape as poorly written, and suggested it was part of a trend to blame social problems on biological causes and had received unwarranted attention due to its controversial subject matter.

However, some reviewers commended the book's discussion of evolutionary theory, offered a mitigated defense of the view that rape has an evolutionary basis, or argued that the view that rape is sexually motivated is partially correct, while suggesting that rape might also involve a desire for violence and domination. Defenders of the book, including its authors, argued that much of the criticism it had received was misinformed and misrepresented what it actually argued. Commentators compared the controversy surrounding A Natural History of Rape to that provoked by the psychologist Richard Herrnstein and the political scientist Charles Murray's The Bell Curve (1994), and suggested that it was partly a result of larger controversies surrounding evolutionary psychology.

Summary

Thornhill and Palmer write that they want to see rape eradicated, and argue that improved understanding of what motivates rape would help achieve this goal, while false assumptions about the motivation of rapists are likely to hinder efforts to prevent rape. They write that rape could be defined as, "copulation resisted to the best of the victim's ability unless such resistance would probably result in death or serious injury to the victim or in death or injury to individuals the victim commonly protects". However, they note that other sexual assaults, including oral or anal penetration of a man or a woman under the same conditions, can also sometimes be called rape. They suggest that theory and research in evolutionary biology and evolutionary psychology can help to elucidate the ultimate (evolutionary) causes (as opposed to primarily proximate causes) of rape by males in different species, including humans. They argue that the capacity for rape is either an adaptation, or, a byproduct of adaptative traits such as sexual desire and aggressiveness that have evolved for reasons that have no direct connection with the benefits or costs of rape. They also discuss the "naturalistic fallacy", which they define as the mistaken assumption that there is a connection "between what is biologically or naturally selected and what is morally right or wrong." In their discussion of it, they cite the philosopher George Edward Moore's Principia Ethica (1903).

Thornhill and Palmer identify the anthropologist Donald Symons as the first author to propose, in The Evolution of Human Sexuality (1979), that rape is "a by-product of adaptations designed for attaining sexual access to consenting partners." They note that Symons has falsely been accused of basing his arguments on the assumption that "behavior is genetically determined", even though he explicitly rejects that assumption and criticizes it at length. They criticize explanations of rape put forward by social scientists, and as well as by feminists such as Susan Brownmiller, who in Against Our Will popularized the feminist view that rape is an expression of male domination that is not sexually motivated. Other feminist authors they criticize include Kate Millett, Germaine Greer, Susan Griffin, and Catharine MacKinnon. They criticize arguments that rape is not sexually motivated on several grounds. In their view, concluding that rape must be motivated by the desire to commit acts of violence because it involves force or the threat of force is as illogical as concluding that men who pay prostitutes for sex are motivated by charity. They criticize the argument that rape cannot be sexually motivated because rapists do not prefer sexually attractive victims by citing evidence that a disproportionate number of rape victims are women in their teens and early twenties. They also criticize Sigmund Freud, the founder of psychoanalysis, arguing that his influence led to "the widespread adoption of the myth that women subconsciously desire to be raped."

Publication history
A Natural History of Rape was published by MIT Press in 2000.

Reception

Mainstream media
A Natural History of Rape received mixed reviews from Gregg Sapp in Library Journal and the philosopher Massimo Pigliucci in Skeptic, and negative reviews from Sue Lees in The Times Literary Supplement, the psychologist Tom Sambrook in The Times Higher Education Supplement, the primatologist Frans de Waal in The New York Times, the biologist Jerry Coyne in The New Republic, the journalist Natalie Angier in Ms., the anthropologist Craig Stanford in American Scientist, Judith B. Greenberg in Science Books & Films, and Publishers Weekly. The book was also discussed by the journalist Barbara Ehrenreich in Time, Judy Quinn in Publishers Weekly, Marianne Meed Ward in Report / Newsmagazine (Alberta Edition), Erica Goode in The New York Times, Lyn Cockburn in Herizons, the feminist author Jennifer Pozner in Extra!, the science writer Kendrick Frazier in Skeptical Inquirer, and the philosopher Nancy Pearcey in Human Events. Thornhill discussed the book in an interview with David Concar in New Scientist. Subsequent discussions of the book include those by the journalists Sharon Begley in The Daily Beast and Anil Ananthaswamy in New Scientist.

Sapp wrote that even the book's title would be regarded as "inflammatory". He believed that the authors' theories had a biological aspect worth considering, but also a questionable ideological aspect. He criticized Thornhill and Palmer's proposals for rape prevention as potentially offensive and predicted that A Natural History of Rape could generate as much controversy as the psychologist Richard Herrnstein and the political scientist Charles Murray's "infamous" The Bell Curve (1994). Pigliucci observed that the book was controversial due to both its subject matter and the controversial status of evolutionary psychology itself. He considered the basic features of Thornhill and Palmer's argument reasonable, and rejected the suggestion that their view that rape is either an adaptation or a by-product is trivial. However, he believed that they were mistaken to reject entirely the idea that rape is motivated by a desire for "violence and domination", arguing that it was more likely that it and sexual urges played an important role. He noted that rape victims include very young or old individuals or persons of the same sex, and argued that a "social-psychological explanation" better explained such cases. He also argued that Thornhill and Palmer ignored the fact that selection was not the only evolutionary force that could potentially influence culture and provided insufficient discussion of rape among non-human animals.

Lees argued that the book's authors incorrectly used terms such as "rape" to refer to animal behavior, mistakenly reasoned that rape must be motivated by a reproductive drive because it can result in reproduction, and could not explain rapes that cannot result in reproduction, such as those involving persons of the same sex or children. She maintained that evidence contradicts their claim that rape results from young men lacking role models, and compared their proposals for preventing rape to the views of the Taliban. She also rejected their view that rape is sexually motivated, maintaining that it was "primarily about control and violation." However, she noted that their views had received much attention. Sambrook described the book as depressing. He argued that its authors failed to produce compelling evidence that rape is an adaptation, to look for evidence that would falsify their claims, or consider rape of males. He considered them vulnerable to the charge of genetic determinism, and criticized their view that rape is sexually motivated.

De Waal considered the book polemical and poorly written. He criticized its authors for providing few "real-life descriptions of rape", dismissing women as ideological while presenting scientists as objective, and making insufficient use of psychology and evidence from primate behavior. He argued that their view that rape is "primarily sexual" was, like the opposite position that rape is primarily about power, biased. He argued that they failed to support their view that rape is a product of natural selection with evidence showing that men who rape differ genetically from men who do not rape and sire more children than they could without committing rape, employed questionable comparisons between humans and non-human animals such as insects, attached undue importance to men's ability to detect female vulnerability and to premature ejaculation, ignored the fact that even common forms of behavior are not necessarily adaptive, and failed to distinguish between different kinds of rape. He noted that one-third of rape victims are young children and the elderly, that men rape women with whom they also have consensual sex, and that the majority of men do not rape. He considered the book potentially offensive. He criticized its authors' proposals for rape prevention, writing that they wrongly saw the United States as a typical country rather than one especially rape-prone, and ignored "cross-cultural information".

Coyne attributed the "furor" that followed the book's publication to the popularity of evolutionary psychology. He wrote that while some evolutionary psychologists had responded to it positively, its authors had clashed with feminists. He considered their claim that "rape is at least partially a sexual act" correct but not novel. He argued that their hypothesis that rape is a byproduct cannot be falsified and as such is unscientific, and that it was compatible with both the idea that rape results from male sexuality and aggression and the feminist view that rape is about male domination. He questioned their comparisons between humans and non-human animals. He found their attempt to argue for the adaptation hypothesis using contemporary statistics inconsistent with other views they expressed. He argued that evidence shows that rape often involves violence beyond that necessary to force copulation, and that many rapes are gang rapes or involve homosexual acts, but does not show that rape increases reproduction. He accused the book's authors of misrepresenting scholarly literature, including Thornhill's earlier publications, of ignoring positive contributions by feminists to legal and cultural change, and of attempting to use evolutionary psychology to control social science and social policy. He criticized their proposals for preventing rape. He concluded that A Natural History of Rape was "advocacy" rather than science, and compared evolutionary psychology to psychoanalysis, arguing that both used manipulation to fit "every possible explanation of human behavior" into their framework.

Angier described the book as "polemical" and accused its authors of failing to provide "real scientific data" and of misrepresenting both Brownmiller and feminist views on rape more generally. She also believed that they failed to explain why rape is more common in some societies than others and downplayed data inconsistent with their views. She argued that rape is "about sex and power", and questioned Thornhill and Palmer's use of evidence relating to the behavior of non-human animals, and their proposals for preventing rape.

Stanford considered the book disappointing and "an ideological rant". He believed that it had received more attention than it deserved because of its controversial subject matter. He noted that it had angered people who consider rape primarily violence against women, though in his view it had received a positive reaction from its authors' colleagues. Though he considered it reasonable to hypothesize that rape might have a biological foundation, he believed that Thornhill and Palmer's argument was based on inadequate evidence. He accused them of making "sweeping species-wide statements about male-female mating preferences", such as that humans are "mildly polygynous", based on superseded sociobiological predictions, of basing their claims on "pop books", and of engaging in "an impassioned and rambling bashing of the social sciences", and of wrongly considering an  "any trait that seems well designed" to be an adaptation. He criticized their use of The Evolution of Human Sexuality, describing it as "an early think piece". He maintained that their data actually showed that rape has more reproductive costs than benefits and therefore cannot be a mating adaptation, and concluded that A Natural History of Rape was oversimplified, "the worst that evolutionary psychology has to offer", and damaged "both the cause of rape prevention and that of evolutionary psychology."

Greenberg believed that Thornhill and Palmer correctly acknowledged "the contribution of sexuality to rape", but that their "theoretical discussion" was "weak". She criticized their failure to provide evidence that rape "increases a man's progeny", and argued that the fact that some rape victims are men, elderly women, or children, counted against their views. She also criticized their failure to adequately explain why many men do not rape, and their proposals for preventing rape, which she described as "limited".

Publishers Weekly noted that the book had quickly become "highly controversial" and that its authors' claims were "provocative". It questioned Thornhill's suggestion that rape victims of reproductive age "feel worse afterward than older and younger victims", querying "how he measured young girls' or older women's pain." Ehrenreich accused Thornhill and Palmer of minimizing the amount of physical violence associated with rape and criticized their proposals for preventing rape. According to Quinn, A Natural History of Rape was discussed prior to its publication in prominent stories in The New York Times and USA Today, and the controversy surrounding the book encouraged MIT Press to publish it early. Quinn stated that while MIT Press was aware that it would be controversial, they were surprised by "how much the science media picked up on the early excerpt of the book" published in The Sciences, and had expected instead that it would receive attention following a pre-publication piece in Newsweek.

Ward considered the book part of a trend toward blaming "objectionable conduct" on a person's genes. Goode, writing before the book's publication, stated that Thornhill and Palmer's view that rape is essentially a sexual act and that it may have an evolutionary basis were not novel, though she noted that their recommendations for rape prevention went beyond such familiar claims, and that their work had already provoked anger due to the appearance of an extract in The Sciences. According to Goode, while Brownmiller and several other authors had criticized them, Symons agreed with their view of male sexuality. Cockburn accused Thornhill and Palmer of ignoring the fact that "every other creature in the world also does its best to procreate and hardly any of them ever mate without the female's consent." She also argued that the book tended to stereotype and defame men, undermining the idea that they should have positions of responsibility, and that its authors should be ashamed of themselves. Pozner wrote that when an excerpt of the book was published in The Sciences, it received extensive mainstream media coverage and the book's authors "became highly sought-after media stars." She accused them of promoting "speculative and untestable science" and criticized reporters for failing to "compare Thornhill and Palmer's claims against the exhaustive research conducted on rape victims and rapists over the past 30 years." She compared A Natural History of Rape to The Bell Curve. Frazier noted that the book had caused controversy even before its release.

Pearcey wrote that the book was controversial and its claim that rape is an adaptation "inflammatory". Begley wrote that the book was denounced by feminists, sex-crime prosecutors and social scientists and that the biologist Joan Roughgarden described it as "the latest 'evolution made me do it' excuse for criminal behavior from evolutionary psychologists." Ananthaswamy, writing with Kate Douglas, stated that the book "caused public outrage" and was described as "morally irresponsible" by the zoologist Tim Birkhead. He argued against Thornhill and Palmer's suggestion that rape is an evolutionary adaptation, writing that, "While one study found that women are 2.5 times more likely to become pregnant after rape than consensual sex, even when accounting for the use of contraception, the idea doesn't account for the rape of men or children."

Scientific and academic journals
A Natural History of Rape received positive reviews from Owen D. Jones in the Cornell Law Review, the psychologist Todd K. Shackelford and Gregory J. LeBlanc in the Journal of Sex Research, and R. S. Machalek in Reviews in Anthropology, mixed reviews from Daphne Patai in Gender Issues and the sexologist Michael C. Seto in Animal Behaviour, and negative reviews from the biologists Jerry Coyne and Andrew Berry in Nature, the anthropologist Jeffrey H. Schwartz in History and Philosophy of the Life Sciences, Lisa Sanchez in Gender Issues, the sociologist Hilary Rose in The Lancet, Diane Wolfthal in the Journal of the History of Sexuality, the philosopher Elisabeth Lloyd in Michigan Law Review, the biologist Zuleyma Tang-Martínez and Mindy Mechanic in American Anthropologist, E. M. Dadlez et al. in the Journal of Social Philosophy, and, in Psychology, Evolution & Gender, by the psychologist M. Suzanne Zeedyk, Lynne Segal, and Jason A. Wheeler Vega.

The book was also discussed by Todd Melby in Contemporary Sexuality, the psychologist Mary P. Koss in Trauma, Violence, & Abuse, Eric Smith et al. in Trends in Ecology & Evolution, Paula Nicolson in Psychology, Evolution & Gender, David Sloan Wilson et al. in Biology and Philosophy, Richard Hamilton in Theory, Culture & Society, H. G. Cocks in Contemporary British History, Griet Vandermassen in Sex Roles, Pratiksha Baxi in the Annual Review of Anthropology, and Thornhill and Palmer in Psychology, Evolution & Gender, Evolutionary Psychology, and the Journal of Sex Research.

Jones wrote that the book became controversial after an extract was published in The Sciences, and that many commentators expressed a "vicious" view of it, despite not having seen a manuscript. He wrote that most commentators had not understood the book, and that some ascribed views to its authors they had never expressed, such as that rapists are not responsible for their behavior, that rape is motivated solely by desire for sex, and that rape is inevitable. He considered the book useful from a legal standpoint, and credited its authors with demonstrating that inaccurate assumptions about the causes of rape hinder attempts to prevent rape and that theories of behavior must be empirically tested, and with putting forward hypotheses based on knowledge of evolution. He commended them for showing "the provocative skepticism that is essential to the search for truth." He found their criticism of orthodox views about the causes of rape, including the idea that rape is never sexually motivated and that it is solely a learned behavior, convincing. He also believed that they were correct to stress that the motives for rape should be distinguished from the tactics used, and to dismiss the idea that only humans engage in forced copulation. However, he criticized the provocative title of the book and Thornhill and Palmer's presentation of their ideas. He considered them unduly dismissive of contributions from other disciplines, such as those of the social sciences. He maintained that while many of the specific charges made against them were false, their scholarship was still open to criticism.

Shackelford and LeBlanc described the book as an "intellectual masterpiece" that was "courageous, compassionate, and scholarly". They credited its authors with explaining the "basic premises of evolution by natural selection" and exposing misunderstandings of the subject, as well as with providing a clear discussion of the evolution of sex differences, demonstrating that an evolutionary perspective is necessary to understand rape and design effective treatments for its victims and perpetrators, discrediting several hypotheses about the ultimate causes of rape, and providing "a brilliant expose of the power of political and social ideology to obscure, interfere with, and even to halt altogether the scientific search for truth about rape and male sexual coercion." They also credited them with exposing the flaws of the "social science theory of rape", agreeing with them that it involves assumptions about human nature incompatible with modern scientific knowledge, and endorsed their view that the idea that evolutionary psychology excludes "social, cultural, or other environmental influences" is uninformed. They wrote that Thornhill and Palmer's "chapters on treatment, education, prevention, and especially the chapter on psychological pain, reveal a sincere compassion and an urgent sense of care and concern for which Thornhill and Palmer have not been credited in the many misinformed reviews of this book."

Machalek credited Thornhill and Palmer with providing "an excellent introduction to evolutionary theory and its application to human behavior", summarizing data, such as that concerning "the age-distribution of rape victims", that conflicted with explanations of rape derived from the standard social science model, discrediting the idea that biological explanations of human social behavior suffer from the "naturalistic fallacy", and suggesting new policies for preventing rape. Though he wrote that they had a "highly reductionistic account of the nature, causes, and consequences of rape", he still believed that their ideas suggested intriguing and novel hypotheses about rape, and encouraged readers to "reconsider their understanding of this horrific human behavior." He concluded that they "provide reason to hope that we can develop a scientifically based understanding" of rape.

Patai credited the book's authors with challenging the feminist idea that rape is about "violence and power" with "impressive documentation", and argued that accusations that they were "blaming the victim" were "hysterical" and ignored what they actually wrote. However, while she noted that they employed much evidence concerning rape in both human societies and non-human animals, she believed that they failed to resolve questions such as what motivates rapes of women who are not of reproductive age and rape of men by other men. She considered it unsurprising that their work had received negative reactions. She argued that while they might or might not be correct in viewing "reproductive advantage as the ultimate cause of rape" hostility to their book was futile, and that feminists should have welcomed a work aimed at preventing rape. She concluded that while they "err in judging rape to be primarily an evolutionary adaptation and not an expression of rage or power, feminists have erred in the opposite direction." However, she also believed that A Natural History of Rape could reinforce "feminist axioms about rape" since Thornhill and Palmer implicitly gave "support to the view that all men are potential rapists."

Seto described the book as "provocative" and "controversial" and wrote that it had received much attention since the publication of an extract in The Sciences. He criticized Thornhill and Palmer for citing "little empirical evidence from studies of male rapists" and for failing to "pay
sufficient attention to a large social science literature on antisocial personality traits and paraphilic sexual interests in rapists." He questioned their claim that convicted rapists tend to be of "lower socioeconomic status" compared to non-rapists. He also criticized their view that child sexual abuse, exhibitionism and frotteurism are by-products of the adaptations governing male sexual desires, arguing that it ignored the distinction between individuals who engaged in such behaviors opportunistically and those who preferred them. He criticized their proposals for preventing rape. He credited them with demonstrating "that a selectionist perspective can be productive in understanding", but believed that they overstated their case. He also found their approach overly polemical and polarizing.

Coyne and Berry wrote that Thornhill and Palmer's analysis of rape formed the basis for an advocacy of evolutionary psychology. They described the book as an "inflammatory" manifesto "outlining evolutionary biology's future conquest of the social sciences", and wrote that in the controversy that followed it scientific evidence had been largely ignored. Schwartz wrote that Thornhill and Palmer argued that "rape has to have been adaptive", a view he rejected because of "the inappropriateness and inapplicability of most of the studies upon which this premise is based". Sanchez questioned the book's scientific status. She considered it a poorly written work of poor scholarship and found its approach "reductionist". She criticized Thornhill and Palmer for using studies suggesting that "men rape women that they believe to be fertile" and argued that they misused data to show that reproductive-age rape victims suffer greater psychological trauma than non-reproductive-age rape victims. She believed that their view that rape is a reproductive adaptation is contradicted by facts such as that many rapes do not involve ejaculation into the vagina, or are perpetrated on children, elderly women, or men, or involve greater violence than that needed to force copulation and "that it is advantageous for men to support their children long enough for them to reproduce". She argued that it was doubtful that rape could be based on a specific set of psychological mechanisms or understood through comparisons to the behavior of non-human animals, which involved the risk of anthropomorphism. She accused Thornhill and Palmer of lacking "intellectual sophistication" and of being dogmatic, and criticized their attitude to feminists, social scientists, rape victims, and women, and their proposals for preventing rape. She concluded that while the attention A Natural History of Rape had received had brought them fame, the book was dangerous.

Rose wrote that the book would inevitably receive attention because of its subject matter. However, she argued that it suffered from conceptual confusion, and that its authors presented inconsistent definitions of rape, one of which, "copulation resisted to the best of the victim's ability unless such resistance would probably result in death or serious injury to the individuals the victim commonly protects", would exclude anal, oral, and same-sex rape. In her view, they failed to explain why some men rape and others do not. She wrote that their "notion that all men are potential rapists only restrained by their self-centred cost-benefit analyses" was "insulting to non-rapist men", and that they failed "to consider the power of the social and cultural context and the ambiguous messages that it gives about rape", were "male-centred", and showed "little sign of being able to listen to women who have been raped." She criticized their proposals to reduce rape as a form of victim-blaming, accused them of engaging in "grandiose speculation" and "crude generalisations" as well as failing to "understand either the social sciences or modern evolutionary theory", and concluded that A Natural History of Rape was "scientific pornography."

Wolfthal accused the book's authors of claiming that there was a conspiracy to exclude their views from scholarly journals and academic conferences. She dismissed the work, writing that its authors wrongly considered it free from ideological bias, and made many claims, such as that "contemporary Western civilization is more rape-prone than earlier societies and that in the past women married younger, when they were most fertile", without evidence. She accused them of misunderstanding the views of Brownmiller and Griffin, and criticized them for denying that "violence plays any role in motivating rapists", for their "idiosyncratic" definition of rape, for making simplistic assumptions such as that "men and women are heterosexual and constructed as binary opposites" and that men are more aggressive and eager to copulate than women, for overstating the role of competition as a driving force, and for failing to consider how changes in modern society, such as the feminist movement, might affect the "dynamics of rape." She rejected their proposals for preventing rape, arguing that women living in western societies would not find them acceptable, and concluded that their work contributed nothing to the understanding of rape.

Lloyd wrote that the book had received significant media attention. However, she questioned Thornhill and Palmer's understanding of evolutionary theory, arguing that they attached undue importance to natural selection and ignored other evolutionary forces. She criticized them for maintaining that "rape behavior constitutes a single, genuine trait", failing to provide evidence for the "relative reproductive success of rapists and nonrapists", dismissing the view that rape results from psychopathology, failed to consider data drawn from comparisons between humans and chimpanzees and bonobos or to provide a detailed description of "circumstances in our evolutionary past", caricatured the views of social scientists, and misrepresented Brownmiller. She argued that that failed to show that rape is an adaptation and questioned their proposals for preventing rape.

Tang-Martínez and Mechanic praised aspects of Thornhill and Palmer's discussions of evolutionary theory and sexual selection. However, they criticized them for maintaining that all human experiences are the result of natural selection, that behavioral differences between men and women are the result of sexual selection, that there is a biological basis to men's tendency toward sexual promiscuity, and that rape is both a "human universal" and found in many animal species. They also argued that they held inconsistent views about whether rape remains an adaptive reproductive strategy and failed to demonstrate the existence of "human traits specialized for rape", and noted that while they argued that the Oedipus complex is an evolutionary impossibility because of the effects of inbreeding depression, they failed to discuss "incestuous rapes by fathers and other relatives that could also result in inbreeding depression." They wrote that their argument that "women who suffer more violent rapes are less traumatized because their injuries are evidence to spouse and kin that they resisted" was contradicted by evidence from rape trauma specialists, that they tried to defend their views by minimizing the frequency of rapes of prepubertal girls, failed to accept that rapes committed by men of high social status contradicts their view that men who have no access to resources and were unable to attract women are most likely to rape, ignored rapes that involved anal or oral sex, homosexual acts, or murder, and dismissed or caricatured the views of their opponents, or attributed political motives to them.

Dadlez et al. wrote that Thornhill and Palmer's suggestion that rape is an adaptation received worldwide attention. However, they believed that they failed to present necessary evidence about the human evolutionary past and the relevance of rape to reproductive success, and noted that many rapes cannot result in reproduction, since they are committed against females not of childbearing age, or involve homosexual acts or oral or anal sex. They also argued that they made sufficient use of primate studies, that evidence conflicts with the idea that rape is an adaptation, and that their alternative suggestion that rape might be a byproduct is trivial. They questioned their claim that rape is primarily sexually motivated and their use of evidence from animal studies, arguing that their approach risked anthropomorphism and that their use of the term "rape" to describe behavior in non-human animals was questionable. They rejected their claim that there are no rape-free societies and their claim that the psychological trauma that can result from rape is an adaptation that helps protect women from rape. They also criticized their proposals for preventing rape and argued that they wrongly dismissed those holding different views as lacking in objectivity while presenting themselves as entirely objective. They believed that despite their intentions they were likely to be misread as providing excuses for rapists.

Zeedyk observed that the book had received much attention and been endorsed by the evolutionary psychologists Steven Pinker and David C. Geary. She rejected its authors' views about how to eradicate rape. She argued that their claims about women's responses to being raped conflicted with women's experience and were based on unsound methods. She rejected their argument that rape is sexually motivated, arguing that from the perspective of a raped woman, there is no distinction between the tactic employed in rape, violence, and the motivation for rape. She also criticized their distinction between "instrumental force and excessive force", arguing that it ignored the victim's perspective. She also argued that they ignored evidence that substantiated the social science account of rape. She criticized them for ignoring forms of violence against women other than rape, and argued that their conception of science was mistaken and that their proposal for preventing rape by informing young men about its legal penalties ignored the fact that "recorded rapes typically fail to come to prosecution" and was more likely to encourage than discourage rape. Nevertheless, she considered A Natural History of Rape important because it was "a good example of contemporary evolutionary psychology". She suggested that an alternative evolutionary approach to rape might focus on men's "innate drive for power".

Segal noted that the book had received media attention and wrote that it was part of a trend to blame social problems on biological factors. She dismissed the work as pseudoscience and described its authors' assertion that rape is about sex rather than violence as a half-truth. She criticized them for suggesting that "human males will rape when their capacity to reproduce successfully is thwarted", basing claims about human behavior on the study of non-human animals such as insects, falsely characterizing their critics as "anti-evolution", holding that certain aspects of "human sexual conduct" are "universally dimorphic" between the sexes, and favoring biological rather than social explanations of the differences that existed. She wrote that, "Talk of ‘natural selection’ in the arena of sexual activity is nothing more than empty speculation without evidence of the evolutionary history of any particular attribute." She criticized Thornhill and Palmer for maintaining that infertile women suffer "less psychological pain" from rape, writing that it ignored what was known about the destructive effects of child sexual abuse. She criticized their proposals for preventing rape and concluded that A Natural History of Rape should be treated with derision.

Wheeler Vega wrote that the book had worsened relations between biological scientists and feminists. Though he supported its goal of eradicating rape, he faulted its authors for their criticism of social science, postmodernism, and feminist explanations of rape. He argued that their discussion of issues such as mind–body dualism showed that they had an "unsophisticated metaphysics" and sought to attribute crude mistakes to authors they criticized. He criticized their treatment of the "naturalistic fallacy", suggesting that they oversimplified the issue and had misappropriated the term from Moore, who used it to refer to "the error of using some single property as a definition of ‘good’", with naturalness being only one possible example of such a property. He also criticized their discussion of the issue of whether forced copulation in animals should be considered rape.

Melby, writing before the book's publication, noted that it had already received "widespread criticism", including from Brownmiller. Koss considered the attention the book had received regrettable, suggesting that way Thornhill and Palmer advanced their ideas had "increased the resistance to evolutionary analysis". She argued that they sought to advance an ideological agenda, that their scientific logic was flawed, and that evidence contradicted their views. She noted that many rapes are committed against women who are not of reproductive age. She also criticized their proposals for preventing rape, and concluded that A Natural History of Rape was "offensive" and misguided. Smith et al. noted that A Natural History of Rape was controversial and had received "sensationalized press coverage". They considered the primary scientific weaknesses of the work its authors' "lack of explicit models or fitness measures" and "appeal to hypothetical domain-specific evolved psychological mechanisms." They added that effective evaluation of Thornhill and Palmer's hypothesis requires "specification of an evolutionary model, and estimates of the fitness costs and benefits of rape." Employing a fitness cost/benefit mathematical model based on studies of the Aché people in Paraguay, they argued that the costs of tribal rape significantly outweighed its benefits, making it unlikely that rape is an adaptation.

Nicolson considered the book and the responses to it part of a necessary debate. Wilson et al. argued that Thornhill and Palmer inappropriately used the term "naturalistic fallacy" to stifle "meaningful discussion of the ethical issues surrounding the subject of rape", including the implications of the ideas advanced in A Natural History of Rape. Nevertheless, while expressing disagreement with the details of Thornhill and Palmer's views, they granted that Thornhill and Palmer might be correct that rape is an evolved adaptation.

Hamilton compared Thornhill and Palmer's proposals for preventing rape to the views of the Taliban, writing that they might involve "the cloistration of nubile women". He criticized their definition of rape as the coerced vaginal penetration of women of reproductive age, arguing that the exclusion of homosexual rape, rape of women not of the reproductive age, murderous rape, and non-vaginal forms of rape virtually guaranteed the confirmation of their hypothesis that rape is an evolved reproductive strategy, not a crime of violence.

Cocks suggested that the book had become one of the most "infamous" works of evolutionary psychology. He credited its authors with demonstrating that the evidence is at least consistent with their hypothesis that rape is an evolutionary adaptation, and considered them correct to reject the charge that they are genetic determinists. However, he questioned whether their conclusion that rape is the result of both genetic and environmental factors went beyond the obvious and criticized their view "that ultimate causes can explain all proximate ones." Vandermassen noted that the book brought attention to evolutionary theories of rape, but also provoked controversy and, like other attempts to explain human behavior in biological terms, was greeted with hostility by many feminists and social scientists. Though finding such reactions understandable, she argued that it is possible to combine feminist and evolutionary accounts of rape. She suggested that while critics of Thornhill and Palmer might be ideologically motivated, Thornhill and Palmer's work was also biased. Though regarding their provocative approach as partly responsible for the book's negative reception, she also suggested that few critics understood it. She maintained that while many accusations against them were false, their scholarship was questionable, and they underestimated the importance of non-sexual motivations of rape. She wrote that they misused data to try to support their predictions about the "degree of psychological pain experienced by rape victims", and was unconvinced by their response to the charge.

Baxi, writing in 2014, described the book as being part of "a recent resurgence of biological and evolutionary theories of rape", and endorsed the opinion of a critic who maintained that it amounted to "an incitement to rape" by suggesting that rape is an "unchangeable" form of behavior.

Thornhill and Palmer, writing in Psychology, Evolution & Gender, wrote that A Natural History of Rape had been criticized by "social constructionists", and that media accounts and reviews of the book misunderstood and misrepresented it, falsely ascribing to them views such as that "rape is good", that rapists are not responsible for their behavior, that "all men will rape", that rapists are driven by "desire to produce offspring" rather than desire for sexual stimulation, and that victims should be blamed. They also maintained that their arguments had been wrongly characterized as anti-feminist, and that they had been falsely accused of having no scientific evidence, of basing their conclusions only on evidence concerning insects, and of being unable to explain rape of men, boys, and "non-reproductive-age females." They wrote that many scholarly discussions of the book had falsely portrayed its goal as being to show that rape is an adaptation and ignored the fact that they considered a range of hypotheses and did not conclude that rape is an adaptation.

Thornhill and Palmer, writing in Evolutionary Psychology, responded to criticism of A Natural History of Rape presented in Cheryl Brown Travis's anthology Evolution, Gender, and Rape (2003). They noted that they agreed with some of the claims made in the book, including that media coverage of A Natural History of Rape had been "largely negative". However, they described the book as a misleading account of their work, arguing that it was dedicated to discrediting A Natural History of Rape "at any price."

Thornhill and Palmer, writing in the Journal of Sex Research, argued that much of the criticism their work had received consisted of straw man arguments that were "inherently contradictory and illogical" or which misunderstood or misrepresented their views. According to them, these false claims included the suggestion that their work was "an example of facile enthusiasm for adaptationist explanations of evolutionary phenomena" and that they forced their data to support their conclusions. In reply they pointed out that the hypothesis that rape is an adaptive strategy was only one of two possible explanations for rape they considered, the other being that rape is "a by-product of differences in male and female sexualities." They wrote that they made some of the same points that their critics used to try to discredit their work. They questioned Smith's claim that ethnographic evidence demonstrates that the overall reproductive costs of rape are higher than its benefits and wrote that Smith's argument "actually implies a lower standard for identifying adaptation than the one we used in our book" and "implies that rape could be considered an adaptation if its current reproductive benefits outweigh its cost to reproductive success."

Evaluations in books
The psychologist Margo Wilson credited Thornhill and Palmer with being aware of women's feelings about rape and with wanting to benefit women in the foreword to A Natural History of Rape. She believed that they offered "many novel and nonintuitive insights about why rape occurs and why women are so devastated by the victimization." The sociologist Hilary Rose and the biologist Steven Rose called A Natural History of Rape, "perhaps the nadir of evolutionary psychology's speculative fantasies" in their anthology Alas, Poor Darwin (2000). They wrote that its authors described forced sex among animals as rape despite the fact that leading journals of animal behavior had rejected that characterization as a form of anthropomorphism as long ago as the 1980s and failed to address evidence showing that while forced sex among animals always takes place with fertile females, human rape victims are often either too young or too old to be fertile. The Roses also accused them of insulting rape victims by suggesting that they might have invited sex by wearing revealing clothing, and criticized them for preferring ultimate to proximate explanations, considering the latter to be more explanatory. The Roses suggested that they underestimated the incidence of rape, and wrote that their ideas were "offensive both to women and also to the project of building a culture which rejects rape."

Richard Morris stated that A Natural History of Rape caused "a great deal of controversy" and that some critics objected "quite violently" to its authors' ideas in The Evolutionists (2001). He considered it unfortunate that the controversy obscured the fact that their work was not only about rape, but was also a defense of evolutionary psychology. Pinker described the work as among the most "incendiary" books of recent years in The Blank Slate (2002). He compared it to The Bell Curve and the psychologist Judith Rich Harris's The Nurture Assumption (1998). He credited its authors with bringing attention to scientific research on rape and its connection with human nature, but observed that they also "brought down more condemnation on evolutionary psychology than any issue had in years". According to Pinker, they had been attacked by both the left and the right for acknowledging biological influences on human behavior. This included a Feminist Majority Foundation spokesperson calling A Natural History of Rape "scary" and "regressive" and a spokesperson for the creationist Discovery Institute calling it a threat to morality. Pinker agreed with Thornhill and Palmer that rape is sexually motivated. However, he criticized them for establishing a dichotomy between the suggestion that rape is an adaptation and the suggestion that rape is a byproduct, writing that this diverted attention from the more basic claim that rape is related to sex. He considered their proposals for preventing rape untested and questionable, but added that critics reacted to them with unjustified outrage.

The sociologist Michael Kimmel criticized Thornhill and Palmer's argument that female rape victims tend to be sexually attractive young women, rather than children or older women, contrary to what would be expected if rapists selected victims based on inability to resist, in Evolution, Gender, and Rape. He argued that younger women are the least likely to be married and the most likely to be out on dates with men, and therefore are the most likely to be raped because of opportunity arising from social exposure and marital status. The bioethicist Alice Dreger wrote in Galileo's Middle Finger (2015) that Palmer showed her that most of the criticisms directed against A Natural History of Rape attributed "ignorant and obnoxious" views to its authors that they had never expressed, such as that rape is normal and that men cannot help raping.

Other responses
Thornhill debated his and Palmer's conclusions about rape with Brownmiller on American public radio.

See also
 Sexual coercion
 Sexual Violence: Opposing Viewpoints
 Sociobiological theories of rape

References

Bibliography
Books

 
 
 
 
 
 
 

Journals

 
 
 
  
 
  
 
 
  
  
 
 
 
 
  
 
  
  
  
  
 
  
  
  
  
 
  
  
 
  
  
 
  
 
  
  
 
  
  
  
  
 
  
  
  

Online articles

 
 
 
 

2000 non-fiction books
American non-fiction books
Books about evolutionary psychology
Books about rape
Books by Randy Thornhill
English-language books
MIT Press books